"" is the national anthem of Greenland, an autonomous state of the Kingdom of Denmark. Written by Henning Jakob Henrik Lund in 1912, it was officially adopted in 1916. Music for it was later composed by Jonathan Petersen in 1937.

The reference to Kalaallit as "half-grown children" yearning to join the "advanced nations" of the world has been considered controversial in modern times. Since 1979, "Nuna asiilasooq" ("The Land of Great Length"), an ethnic anthem used by the self-governing Kalaallit, has also been officially recognised by the government.

History 
The song was written in 1912 by Greenlandic priest Henning Jakob Henrik Lund, originally set to the melody of the Swedish national anthem, "Du gamla, du fria". It was one of the first Greenlandic national songs and has been suggested to have been written as a national battle song for politicians pushing for a bill on home rule.

In 1937, organist and piano teacher Jonathan Petersen composed a melody for the anthem. In 1916, it was translated into Danish by Eskimologist William Thalbitzer. It was the only Greenlandic song translated into Danish, and remained so for many years, and as such was given official status as the national anthem of Greenland by Denmark. It was performed in this role at the University of Copenhagen in 1921 for the 200th anniversary of missionary Hans Egede's landing in Greenland and in 1937 for King Christian X's 25-year jubilee. In 1985, Thalbitzer's Danish translation was refined by theologian Mads Lidegaard.

Lyrics
The fifth verse is more often sung after the first verse than the second verse in short versions.

Notes

References

External links
 MIDI and sheet music
 Greenland's regional anthem on YouTube (short version)

Danish anthems
National symbols of Greenland
North American anthems
Greenlandic music
National anthem compositions in E-flat major
Regional songs